Potamolithus is a genus of small freshwater snails that have an operculum, aquatic gastropod mollusks in the family Tateidae.

Potamolithus was traditionally classified within the Hydrobiidae. However, anatomical study of Potamolithus by Davis & Pons da Silva (1984) showed its relationship with Lithoglyphus, and it is then placed within the family Lithoglyphidae.

The first appearance of the name Potamolithus was in November 1896 as a nomen nudum (a bare name with no description or illustration). The genus was formally defined by Pilsbry in December 1896.

Distribution 
Potamolithus is the only genus of the family Tateidae in South America. Distribution of Potamolithus includes Argentina (22 species, 11 species are endemic to Argentina), Uruguay (17 species) and Brazil. Potamolithus is the largest genus (i.e. the one with the highest species richness) of recent freshwater snails in Argentina and in Uruguay.

Species
Species within the genus Potamolithus include:
 Potamolithus agapetus Pilsbry, 1911
 Potamolithus bushii (Frauenfeld, 1865)
 Potamolithus callosus Pilsbry, 1925
 Potamolithus carinifer Pilsbry, 1911
 Potamolithus catharinae Pilsbry, 1911
 Potamolithus concordianus Parodiz, 1966
 Potamolithus conicus (Brot, 1867)
 Potamolithus dinochilus Pilsbry, 1896
 Potamolithus doeringi Pilsbry, 1911
 Potamolithus felipponei Ihering, 1910
 Potamolithus hidalgoi Pilsbry, 1896 - synonyms: Potamolithus microthauma Pilsbry, 1896; Potamolithus dinochilus Pilsbry, 1896; Potamolithus hatcheri Pilsbry, 1911
 Potamolithus iheringi Pilsbry, 1896
 Potamolithus karsticus Simone & Moracchioli, 1994
 Potamolithus lapidum (d'Orbigny, 1835) - synonyms: Potamolithus lapidum supersulcatus Pilsbry, 1896; Potamolithus paysanduanus Ihering, 1910; Potamolithus lapidum var. elatior Pilsbry, 1911; Potamolithus callosus Pilsbry, 1926
 Potamolithus microthauma Pilsbry, 1896
 Potamolithus orbignyi Pilsbry, 1896
 Potamolithus paranensis Pilsbry, 1911
 Potamolithus peristomatus (d'Orbigny, 1835)
 Potamolithus petitianus (d'Orbigny, 1840)
 Potamolithus petitianus sykesii Pilsbry, 1896 - synonyms: Potamolithus bisinuatus bisinuatus Pilsbry, 1896; Potamolithus bisinuatus obsoletus Pilsbry, 1896; Potamolithus gracilis gracilis Pilsbry, 1896; Potamolithus gracilis viridis Pilsbry, 1896
 Potamolithus philipianus Pilsbry, 1911
 Potamolithus quadratus Pilsbry & Ihering, 1911
 Potamolithus rushii Pilsbry, 1896 - type genus
 Potamolithus ribeirensis Pilsbry, 1911
 Potamolithus simplex Pilsbry, 1911
 Potamolithus tricostatus (Brot, 1867)
 Potamolithus troglobius Simone & Moracchioli, 1994
 Potamolithus valchetensis Miquel, 1998

Ecology 
Potamolithus species live in streams. Some species are subterranean, living in caves (for example Potamolithus troglobius and Potamolithus karsticus).

References

Further reading 
 Bichuette M. E. (1998). "Distribuição e biologia de gastrópodes de água doce, gênero Potamolithus, no Vale do Alto Ribeira, São Paulo (Mollusca: Gastropoda: Hydrobiidae)". M. Sc. Thesis – Instituto de Biociências, Universidade de São Paulo, São Paulo, Brasil. 127 pp.
 López Armengol M. F. (1985). "Estudio sistemaco y bioecológico del género Potamolithus (Hydrobiidae) utilizando técnicas de taxonomía numérica Tesis Doctoral (N°. 455)". Facultad de Ciencias Naturales y Museo, Universidad Nacional de La Plata.
 López Armengol M. F. & Darrigran G. (1998). "Distribución del género neotropical Potamolithus Pilsbry & Rush, 1896 (Gastropoda: Hydrobiidae) en el estuario del Río de la Plata". Iberus 16: 267-274.
 Parodiz J. J. (1965). "Relaciones y evidencias paleontológicas de Potamolithus". Comunicaciones de la Sociedad Malacológica del Uruguay 1: 273-278.

External links 

Tateidae